Klaus Baumgartner (21 December 1937 – 10 December 2015) was a Swiss politician.

Biography
After Baumgartner finished school, he received a doctorate in economic and social sciences.  From 1974 to 1988, he was on the Directorate Secretary on the Swiss Federal Office for Housing. From 1977 to 1988, he was a representative of the Social Democratic Party member of the Bern City Council; In 1987, he was a town councilor. He was elected to the Bernese council in 1989 and worked there until 1992 as a welfare and health director. From 1993 to 2004, he was Mayor of Bern. He was succeeded by Alexander Tschäppät.

References

1937 births
2015 deaths
Social Democratic Party of Switzerland politicians
Mayors of Bern